The 2009–10 Syracuse Orange men's basketball team represented Syracuse University in the 2009–10 NCAA Division I men's basketball season. Their head coach was Jim Boeheim, serving for his 34th year. The team played its home games at the Carrier Dome in Syracuse, New York.  Key contributors included seniors Arinze Onuaku and Andy Rautins, juniors Rick Jackson and Wesley Johnson, sophomores Scoop Jardine and Kris Joseph and freshmen Mookie Jones, DaShonte Riley, James Southerland and Brandon Triche.

Although widely expected to finish near the middle of the league, the Orange captured its eighth Big East regular season title, and second outright, as well as the No. 1 seed in the Big East tournament. The team also achieved its first No. 1 ranking in the national AP Poll since the 1989-90 season, and its first in the ESPN/USA Today coaches' poll since winning the national championship in 2003.

The Orange failed to win the Big East tournament, falling in the quarterfinals to Georgetown, but their regular season efforts earned them a 1 seed in the West Region of the 2010 NCAA Division I men's basketball tournament. They easily won their first and second-round games over 16 seed Vermont and 8 seed Gonzaga to advance to the Sweet Sixteen where they were upset by 5 seed and AP #11 Butler to end the season 30–5.

Preseason

Roster changes

Syracuse lost its starting backcourt from the previous season as point guard Jonny Flynn declared for the 2009 NBA draft and was taken with the sixth overall pick by the Minnesota Timberwolves.  Also turning pro were shooting guard Eric Devendorf and small forward Paul Harris.  The Orange also lost one scholarship senior, power forward Kristof Ongenaet and one transfer, center Sean Williams.

Additions to the team include Iowa State transfer Wes Johnson, who sat out the 2008–09 season because of NCAA transfer rules.  Also, point guard Scoop Jardine returns after redshirting due to a stress fracture in his shin.  Small forward Mookie Jones also redshirted the previous year because of a hip injury.

Syracuse also brought in three new players for 2009-10: power forward DaShonte Riley, small forward James Southerland and guard Brandon Triche.  Southerland was actually a 2008 recruit, but could not play because he was academically ineligible.  He spent a year at a prep school to improve his grades.

Recruiting

Roster

Preseason outlook

The departure of Flynn left many college basketball observers pessimistic about the Orange.  In the preseason coaches' poll, Syracuse was predicted to finish sixth in the Big East and were unranked in the preseason AP Poll.  Arinze Onuaku was the only Orange player to make the preseason All-Big East team, receiving an honorable mention.

Season

Notable games

 On November 4, Syracuse was stunned by Division II Le Moyne, 82–79, in its final exhibition game before opening the regular season. The loss was Syracuse's first exhibition loss in six years.
 On November 20, then-No. 24 Syracuse upset then-No. 4 North Carolina 87–71 in the finals of the Coaches Vs. Cancer Classic at Madison Square Garden. Wesley Johnson scored 25 points and collected eight rebounds, and Syracuse used a 22–1 run to open the second half.
 On December 10, then-No. 7 Syracuse knocked off then-No. 10 Florida in a match up of unbeaten teams. Rick Jackson scored a career-high 19 points and grabbed 11 rebounds, Andy Rautins had 18 points and Wes Johnson finished with 17 points and 10 rebounds.
 On January 2, then-No. 5 Syracuse was handed its first loss of the season as it was upset by then-unranked Pittsburgh 82–72. Pitt's Ashton Gibbs scored 24 points and Jermaine Dixon added 21. The Orange was led by Wesley Johnson's 19 points.
 On January 26, Jim Boeheim extended his NCAA Division-I record for most 20-win seasons to 32, when then-No. 4 Syracuse rallied from a 14-0 starting deficit to defeat then-No. 7 Georgetown 73–56. The Orange's Kris Joseph came off the bench to score 15 points, and Wesley Johnson added 14 points and 4 blocks, taking advantage of the Hoyas' 19 turnovers and 20 personal fouls.
On February 27, the Orange clinched its eighth Big East regular season title and a No. 1 seed in the Big East tournament by beating No. 8 Villanova, 95–77. The game also set the NCAA on-campus basketball attendance record, with 34,616 spectators present. Three days later they won the title outright, with a win against St. John's, 85–66.

Other news
 On March 1, two days after beating Villanova, Syracuse achieved its first No. 1 ranking in the AP Poll since the 1989–90 season, and its first in the ESPN/USA Today coaches' poll since winning the national championship in 2003.

Schedule

|-
!colspan=9| Exhibition

|-
!colspan=9| Regular Season

|-
!colspan=9| Big East tournament

|-
!colspan=9| NCAA tournament†

|-

Rankings

2010 signing class

References 

Syracuse Orange
Syracuse Orange men's basketball seasons
Syracuse Orange
Syracuse Orange men's b
Syracuse Orange men's b